Augustus Waller may refer to:

 Augustus Volney Waller (1816–1870), British neurophysiologist
 Augustus Desiré Waller (1856–1922), son of Augustus Volney Waller, scientist